Salem is an unincorporated community in Blue Creek Township, Adams County, in the U.S. state of Indiana.

History
Salem was platted in 1866.

Geography
The average elevation is 823 feet.

References

Unincorporated communities in Indiana
Unincorporated communities in Adams County, Indiana